Stuart Slack (25 January 1935 – 5 December 1998) was a racing cyclist from the Isle of Man.  He was part of the first ever Manx team to participate in the British Empire and Commonwealth Games.

Slack participated in the 1958 British Empire and Commonwealth Games, taking part in the road cycling event.  He finished third in the event, arriving in a five-man group nearly three minutes behind the race winner, Ray Booty winning a Bronze Medal after a photo-finish. In 2011, this result was described as being "against all expectations" and was credited with increasing the popularity of cycling in the Isle of Man.

Later in his life, Slack published two books about the island. He was also a noted Manx musician and Isle of Man folk songwriter. This including the popular folk song ‘The Laxey Wheel’ (1957). A number of different recordings of Stuart Slack's folk songs were banned by the local commercial radio station Manx Radio for being too  "risqué."

Since his death in 1998 there is an annual cycle event in his memory.

In 2002, the Isle of Man Post Office issued a set of postage stamps for the 2002 Commonwealth Games in Manchester including a 22 pence stamp depicting the photo-finish of Stuart Slack's third-place finish in the Men's Cycling Road race at the 1958 Empire Games.

Published works
 Slack, Stuart (2003). Manx Milestones. The Manx Experience. .
 Slack, Stuart (1996). Streets of Douglas – Old and New. The Manx Experience. .

Discography
 Wreck of the Herring Fleet
 The Laxey Wheel
 Bulgham Bombshell
 The Foxdale Miner
 Laxey Girls are the Boys
 Ride the Rails 
 Give Me the Bus Fare to Laxey
 Illiam Done
 Ballamodha Dragoons
 Effort
 My Little Home at Port-e-Chee
 The Port Erin Breakwater Disaster

45 rpm single
 Isle of Man TT Hall of Fame (David Collister) / The Laxey Wheel Song (Stuart Slack) David Collister/Athol Moore Manx Radio Recordings (c.1972) Hillary Productions
 Mannin Folk – Mannin Folk Sing / Track 1. The Laxey Wheel Song (Stuart Slack) Kelly Recordings (1976)
 Give Me The Bus Fare to Laxey (Stuart Slack) / Smugglers Lullaby (Traditional) Mike Williams/Laury Kermode – Kelly Recordings

Sources

External links

Manx male cyclists
Commonwealth Games bronze medallists for the Isle of Man
Cyclists at the 1958 British Empire and Commonwealth Games
1935 births
1998 deaths
Commonwealth Games medallists in cycling
Medallists at the 1958 British Empire and Commonwealth Games